The Cook Islands can be divided into two groups: the Southern Cook Islands and the Northern Cook Islands. The country is located in Oceania, in the South Pacific Ocean, about one-half of the way from Hawaii to New Zealand. 

From March to December, the Cook Islands are in the path of tropical cyclones, the most notable of which were the cyclones Martin and Percy. Two terrestrial ecoregions lie within the islands' territory: the Central Polynesian tropical moist forests and the Cook Islands tropical moist forests.

Islands and reefs

Southern Cook Islands 
Aitutaki
Atiu
Mangaia
Manuae
Mauke
Mitiaro
Palmerston Island
Rarotonga (capital)
Takutea

Northern Cook Islands 
Manihiki
Nassau
Penrhyn atoll
Pukapuka
Rakahanga
Suwarrow

Table

Note: The table is ordered from north to south. Population figures from the 2016 census.

Statistics 

 Area
 Total: 
 Land: 236 km2
 Water: 0 km2
 Area - comparative
 1.3 times the size of Washington, DC
 Coastline
 
 Maritime claims
 Territorial sea: 
 Continental shelf:  or to the edge of the continental margin
 Exclusive economic zone: 
 Climate
 Tropical; moderated by trade winds; a dry season from April to November and a more humid season from December to March
 Terrain
 Low coral atolls in north; volcanic, hilly islands in south
 Elevation extremes
 Lowest point: Pacific Ocean 0 m
 Highest point: Te Manga 
 Natural resources
 coconuts
 Land use
 Arable land: 4.17%
 Permanent crops: 4.17%
 Other: 91.67% (2012 est.)
 
 Natural hazards
 Typhoons (November to March)
 Environment - international agreements
 Party to: Biodiversity, Climate Change-Kyoto Protocol, Desertification, Hazardous Wastes, Law of the Sea, Ozone Layer Protection

See also
List of ecoregions in the Cook Islands

References

External links
 Maritime Boundaries